Angel Wing is a  elevation mountain summit located in the Lewis Range, of Glacier National Park in the U.S. state of Montana. It is situated one mile east of the Continental Divide, in Glacier County. It can be seen from the Many Glacier area, and up close from the Grinnell Glacier Trail.

Climate
Based on the Köppen climate classification, Angel Wing is located in an alpine subarctic climate zone with long, cold, snowy winters, and cool to warm summers. Temperatures can drop below −10 °F with wind chill factors below −30 °F. Precipitation runoff from the peak drains into Grinnell and Cataract Creeks, which are part of the St. Mary River drainage basin.

Geology

Like other mountains in Glacier National Park, Angel Wing is composed of sedimentary rock laid down during the Precambrian to Jurassic periods. The summit is composed of Empire Formation of the Neogene period, and it overlays the Grinnell Formation which is a layer of sandstone and argillite.

Gallery

See also
 Geology of the Rocky Mountains
 List of mountains and mountain ranges of Glacier National Park (U.S.)

References

External links
 Weather forecast: Angel Wing
 Summit view: YouTube

Lewis Range
Mountains of Glacier County, Montana
Mountains of Glacier National Park (U.S.)
Mountains of Montana
North American 2000 m summits